Soul '69 is the fourteenth studio album by American singer Aretha Franklin released in 1969 by Atlantic Records, the album features covered material. The album charted at number 1 on Billboards R&B albums chart and at number 15 on Billboards Top Albums, but launched two largely unsuccessful singles, "Tracks of My Tears", which reached number 21 on "Black Singles" and number 71 on "Pop Singles", and "Gentle on My Mind", which charted at number 50 and number 76 respectively.  The album was re-released on compact disc through Rhino Records in the 1990s.

Critical reception

The album was critically well received. Music journalist Stanley Booth wrote in Rolling Stone that Soul '69 was "quite possibly the best record to appear in the last five years", describing it as "excellent in ways in which pop music hasn't been since the Beatles spear-headed the renaissance of rock". In spite of critical praise and popular success, however, the album has sunk into obscurity, becoming one of what journalist Richie Unterberger terms as "[Aretha Franklin's] most overlooked '60s albums".

Track listing

Personnel
Aretha Franklin – vocals, piano (2,7,9)
Junior Mance – piano (1, 3-6, 8-11)
Spooner Oldham – organ (2,7)
Joe Zawinul – organ (5), piano, Fender Rhodes (6,12)
Kenny Burrell – guitar (1, 3-6, 8-11) 
Jimmy Johnson – guitar (2,7)
Ron Carter – bass guitar (1, 3-6, 8-12)
Jerry Jemmott – bass guitar (2,7)
Tommy Cogbill – bass guitar (2,7)
Bruno Carr – drums (1, 3-6, 8,9, 12) 
Roger Hawkins – drums (2,7) 
Grady Tate – drums (10,11)
Jack Jennings – vibraphone (5,7,9,12)
Louie Goicdecha, Manuel Gonzales – percussion (5,7,12)
David Newman – tenor saxophone, flute
King Curtis, Seldon Powell – tenor saxophone
George Dorsey, Frank Wess – alto saxophone
Pepper Adams – baritone saxophone
Joe Newman, Bernie Glow, Richard Williams, Snooky Young, Ernie Royal – trumpet
Jimmy Cleveland, Urbie Green, Benny Powell, Thomas Mitchell – trombone
Evelyn Greene, Wyline Ivy - backing vocals
Produced by Jerry Wexler and Tom Dowd
Arrangements by Arif Mardin

See also
List of Billboard number-one R&B albums of the 1960s

References

External links 

Aretha Franklin albums
1969 albums
Albums produced by Tom Dowd
Albums produced by Jerry Wexler
Atlantic Records albums
Covers albums
Albums conducted by Arif Mardin
Albums arranged by Arif Mardin